Johannes Haasnoot (25 January 1897 – 5 August 1987) was a Dutch rower. He competed in the men's eight event at the 1920 Summer Olympics.

References

External links
 

1897 births
1987 deaths
Dutch male rowers
Olympic rowers of the Netherlands
Rowers at the 1920 Summer Olympics
Sportspeople from Maassluis